Branislav Konrád (born 10 October 1987) is a Slovak professional ice hockey goaltender for HC Olomouc of the Czech Extraliga and Slovakia. He previously played for HC Dukla Trenčín and HK Nitra in the Slovak Extraliga, and Metallurg Zhlobin in the Belarusian Extraleague.

Awards and honors

References

External links

1987 births
Living people
Sportspeople from Nitra
HK Dukla Trenčín players
Heilbronner EC players
Metallurg Zhlobin players
HK Nitra players
HC Nové Zámky players
HC Oceláři Třinec players
HC Olomouc players
HC Slovan Bratislava players
Slovak ice hockey goaltenders
Ice hockey players at the 2018 Winter Olympics
Ice hockey players at the 2022 Winter Olympics
Olympic ice hockey players of Slovakia
Medalists at the 2022 Winter Olympics
Olympic bronze medalists for Slovakia
Olympic medalists in ice hockey
Slovak expatriate ice hockey players in the Czech Republic
Slovak expatriate ice hockey players in Germany
Expatriate ice hockey players in Belarus
Slovak expatriate sportspeople in Belarus